English-language idioms
Hypocrisy